Geoffrey I. Webb (also known as Geoff Webb) is Professor of Computer Science at Monash University, founder and director of Data Mining software development and consultancy company G. I. Webb and Associates, and former editor-in-chief of the journal Data Mining and Knowledge Discovery.  Before joining Monash University he was on the faculty at Griffith University from 1986 to 1988 and then at Deakin University from 1988 to 2002.

Webb has published more than 280 scientific papers in the fields of machine learning, data science, data mining, data analytics, time series analytics, big data, bioinformatics and user modeling.  He is an editor of the Encyclopedia of Machine Learning.

Webb created the Averaged One-Dependence Estimators (AODE) machine learning algorithm and its generalization Averaged N-Dependence Estimators (ANDE) and has worked extensively on statistically sound association rule learning.
  His early work included advocating the use of machine learning to create black box user models;
interactive machine learning;
decision tree grafting;
and one of the first approaches to association rule learning using minimum support and confidence to find the rules for the first associative classifier, FBM. He has developed multiple novel approaches to time series classification. He has worked on diverse problems including 
concept drift, 
scalable learning of graphical models, 
human in the loop machine learning, 
computational protein biology.

Webb's awards include inaugural Eureka Prize for Excellence in Data Science, 2017, IEEE Fellow, Pacific-Asia Conference on Knowledge Discovery and Data Mining Distinguished Research Contributions Award, 2022, Australian Computer Society ICT Researcher of the Year Award 2016, the IEEE International Conference on Data Mining Outstanding Service Award, 2013 an Australian Research Council Outstanding Researcher Award, 2014 and multiple Australian Research Council Discovery Grants.
He has twice been recognised by The Australian Research Magazine as Australia's leading Bioinformatics and Computational Biology researcher.

Webb is a foundation member of the editorial advisory board of the journal Statistical Analysis and Data Mining.
He has served on the Editorial Boards of the journals Machine Learning, ACM Transactions on Knowledge Discovery in Data, User Modeling and User
Adapted Interaction, and Knowledge and Information Systems.

Webb was elected to the ACM Special Interest Group on Knowledge Discovery and Data Mining Executive Committee in 2017.

External links
 Webb's home page
 G. I. Webb and Associates

References

Australian computer scientists
Living people
Academic staff of Monash University
People from Melbourne
Year of birth missing (living people)